Bartrès is a commune in the Hautes-Pyrénées department in southwestern France.

The village is famous for its association with St. Bernadette Soubirous. St. Bernadette was sent there in her infancy to a wet nurse, and again in her early teens to work for the same lady as a shepherdess. Today, the village is visited by numerous pilgrims who come to pray at the village church and venerate a relic of the saint.

Population

External links 
Bartrès website

See also
Communes of the Hautes-Pyrénées department

References

Communes of Hautes-Pyrénées